Grand Valley High School is a public high school in Orwell, Ohio, United States.  It is the only high school in the Grand Valley Local School District. It serves the students of Hartsgrove, Orwell, Rome, Colebrook, and Windsor townships in Ashtabula County. Students at Grand Valley High School have the opportunity to enroll in a Post Secondary Education Option or attend the Ashtabula County Technical & Career Campus (A-Tech) for career technical programs. Athletic teams compete as the Grand Valley Mustangs in the Ohio High School Athletic Association as a member of the Northeastern Athletic Conference.

Academics
There are over 1400 students that attend classes in one elementary, one middle school, and one high school, all located on one new campus. Special features of the elementary curriculum include instruction in art, music, and physical education. The use of computers in the elementary and middle school classrooms provides enhanced learning opportunities for students.

The Grand Valley High School offers a comprehensive academic program including a broad based college preparatory program and a four-year math requirement. This program is complemented with foreign language courses. More specialized curricular offerings such as vocational agriculture and career counseling. In addition; High School Students have the opportunity to attend the Ashtabula County Technical & Career Campus.

Community support of the Grand Valley Local School District is strong. Parents and community members have provided active support of two P.T.O.s, Athletic Boosters, Band Boosters, Academic Boosters, Choir Boosters and Drama Boosters, as well as, individual school sponsored activities and programs such as their new Football Field improvements. The district boasts a P-12 244,000 sq. ft. facility which is situated on 94.6 acres completed in August 2005. A new football stadium and track facility complete with an eight lane weather track adjacent to the new school opened in August 2006.

Due to failures of school levies, the school suffered many budget cuts. Sports programs have experienced staff cuts and has reverted to a pay-to-play program. Bus routes have been molded together and disbanded. The school board has warned that the recent 2011 levy failure will result in the elimination of the elementary art, music, and gym programs. It may also lead to the removal high school study hall, the firing of teachers and more staff, and the removal of more bus routes.

Athletics
Sports offered include Basketball, Football, Volleyball, Golf, Soccer, Track, Cross Country, Baseball, Softball, and Wrestling.

OHSAA State Championships
Boys Track and Field – 1943*
 * Title won by Stewart High School in Rome Township prior to merging into Grand Valley.

Wrestling - 1980 (Bill Nye & Mike Fletcher State Champions)

Conference Championships
Football - 1966, 1978, 1979, 1981, 1987, 1992, 1996, 1997, 2012, 2013, 2015, 2016, 2017

References

External links
 District website

High schools in Ashtabula County, Ohio
Public high schools in Ohio